In the U.S. state of Wisconsin, U.S. Highway 14 (US 14) runs northwest-southeast across the western to southwest portions of the state. It links La Crosse and the southwestern portion of the state with Madison and Janesville.  US 14 is mostly two-lane surface road with the exception of a few multilane urban arterials and a freeway section around Madison that it mostly shares with US 12.

Route description

US 14 enters Wisconsin from La Crescent along with US 61 and WIS 16 (linking to Trunk Highway 16). The three highways immediately junction with US 53 in the downtown area and WIS 16 continues east while US 14 along with US 61 turn southeast and out of La Crosse, linking up with WIS 35 south along the way for three miles (5 km), after a short concurrency, US 14 and US 61 turn east while WIS 35 continues south.  The US routes then exit La Crosse County for Vernon County. In Vernon County, the routes passes through Coon Valley and Westby, joining with WIS 27 and turning south and passing through Viroqua. WIS 27 splits off to the southwest as US 14 and US 61 head southeast to Readstown where US 61 turns south and US 14 heads east into Richland County.

US 14 continues southeast into Richland County, bypassing Sylvan and Boaz before turning east. After a seven-mile (11 km) east trek, the highway enters Richland Center and immediately turns south. WIS 80 crosses the highway in the southern part of downtown before US 14 turns southeast and junctions with WIS 58. US 14 passes through Sextonville and turns south to collect WIS 60 at Gotham. The two highways then head east-southeast to Lone Rock where they cross WIS 130 and exit to Sauk County The routes then split at Spring Green while crossing WIS 23, with US 14 heading south into Iowa County while WIS 60 continues east. US 14 bypasses Helena and passes through Arena and into Dane County. US 14 turns southeast at Mazomanie and junctions with WIS 19, then passes through Black Earth, Cross Plains and turns east to meet US 12 east at the West Beltline Highway in Middleton, a suburb of Madison.

US 14 and US 12 follow the beltline south and around the west side of Madison and join US 18 east and US 151 north. All four US routes head east for three miles (5 km) through urban Madison where US 151 splits north to head into downtown Madison and US 12 and 18 continue east, while US 14 turns south toward Oregon on a seven-mile (11 km) stretch of freeway.  the highway bypasses Oregon to the east and becomes a two lane road and enters Rock County east of Brooklyn. US 14 turns southeastward at Evansville and passes through Leyden and then takes a northeastern bypass around Janesville, crossing U.S. Route 51 in Wisconsin and meeting up with I-39, I-90 and WIS 26 at a triangle formed by the three distinct routes northeast of the city. US 14 then turns south and meets Wisconsin Highway 11. Both highways turn east and pass through Emerald Grove on the way into Walworth County US 14 turns southeast to Darien while WIS 11 continues east to Delavan. US 14 junctions with I-43 just before passing through Darien. At Walworth, the highway turns due south and heads into Illinois.

History
US 14 was signed later than the other US Routes in Wisconsin, being opened in 1933.  The route replaced the old versions of WIS 11, from La Crosse to Madison, WIS 13 from Madison to Evansville, WIS 92 into Janesville, and WIS 20 and WIS 89 from Janesville to Illinois.  The older WIS 14 was in existence when US 14 was opened, that was redesignated as WIS 81 and WIS 15 (the latter being the present-day I-43.

La Crosse saw a major upgrade in the Mississippi River Bridge on its west side which carried US 14 along with US 61 and WIS 16/TH 16.  An additional bridge was added to the existing "Cass Street Bridge" in 2003-2004 to relieve traffic congestion that plagued the old bridge.  The old bridge, which served two-lane traffic before 2004, now serves two lanes of westbound traffic and the new bridge, dubbed the "Cameron Avenue Bridge," carries two lanes of eastbound traffic along with pedestrian and bicycle facilities.  Additional lanes were added to the highway between the channels of the Mississippi River.

Major intersections

Special routes

Business Route US 14 in Janesville was a locally posted route along what used to be mainline US 14 until the early 1950s.  Currently, only the portion from I-39/I-90, east toward US 14 east of Janesville, runs along WIS 11.  Northwest of Janesville, BUS US 14 runs along County Trunk Highway E (CTH-E).

Signage for BUS US 14 appears to be missing at some locations within the city.  It is unknown if the route markers are currently being maintained by the city or if they are no longer being replaced as they reach the end of their lifespans.

While City US 14 became BUS US 14 in the 1960s, several City US 14 route marker assemblies remain in Janesville.  Also, the first reassurance marker assembly along CTH-E also includes a sign for BUS US 14.

See also

References

External links

 Wisconsin
14
Transportation in La Crosse County, Wisconsin
Transportation in Vernon County, Wisconsin
Transportation in Richland County, Wisconsin
Transportation in Sauk County, Wisconsin
Transportation in Iowa County, Wisconsin
Transportation in Dane County, Wisconsin
Transportation in Rock County, Wisconsin
Transportation in Walworth County, Wisconsin